Our Lady Seat of Wisdom College (SWC), formerly Our Lady Seat of Wisdom Academy, is a private Catholic liberal arts college located in Barry's Bay, Ontario, Canada. The college offers a three-year Bachelor of Catholic Studies program with concentrations in Theology, Philosophy, History, Literature, and Classical and Early Christian Studies, as well as studies in mathematics, Languages, Sacred Music, Fine Arts, Natural and Social Sciences. SWC is known for its traditional Catholic teaching and values.

History

Our Lady Seat of Wisdom grew out of a 1999 study group called “Mater Ecclesiae” in Combermere, Ontario, under the directorship of John Paul Meenan. The centre sought  to provide affordable Catholic education to students wishing to advance their studies after high school. In the early days, studies took place in living rooms, basements, hay lofts, and other areas hosted by local families, while teaching and tuition were free.

In 2000, the Roman Catholic Diocese of Pembroke donated the former grounds of St. Joseph's Convent for use by members of the study centre. In September 2000, Our Lady Seat of Wisdom Academy was established, and the school had its first official academic year which saw nine students and several teachers. In 2003, the academy added a second year of study to their program, and a third year in 2004.

Our Lady Seat of Wisdom was approved by the province of Ontario to offer a three-year Bachelor of Catholic Studies degree in 2017, henceforward becoming known as Our Lady Seat of Wisdom College. SWC is currently pursuing approval for a four-year Bachelor of Arts degree.

In September 2017, there were 136 students and a student-faculty ratio of 13:1.

SWC has been featured in The Newman Guide to Choosing a Catholic College as one of the institutions around the world listed as faithfully Catholic colleges.

Academic Profile

Liberal Arts Education
“[The purpose of a liberal arts education is to] open the mind, to correct it, to refine it, to enable it to know, and to digest, master, rule, and use its knowledge, to give it power over its own faculties, application, flexibility, method, critical exactness, sagacity, resource, address, [and] eloquent expression. . . .” 

The courses at Our Lady Seat of Wisdom are centered on Catholic liberal arts, faithful to the Magisterium of the Church. With liberal arts education underlying the academics, SWC has a core curriculum that encompasses studies in theology, Philosophy, History, Literature, Languages, Fine Arts, Sacred Music, and Natural and Social Sciences.

From SWC's website: "Seat of Wisdom College provides students with all the benefits of a truly excellent, faithfully Catholic liberal arts education from professors who all take the Oath of Fidelity to the Magisterium every year. Our students learn to think clearly and reason logically, to communicate well, and are given a broad base of knowledge within the context of knowing the Truth – Christ Himself – who alone can set us free."

Programs and Degree-Granting Status 
On May 1, 2017, Our Lady Seat of Wisdom received degree-granting status and the title of "College" in the province of Ontario. OLSW was approved by the Ontario Ministry of Advanced Education and Skills Development (now the Ministry of Colleges and Universities) to grant a Bachelor of Catholic Studies degree. The first students received this degree at the end of the 2016–2017 academic year. SWC is working toward granting a four-year bachelor's degree. The college also grants various Certificates of Christian Humanities. SWC focuses on a core liberal arts curriculum.

Student life
Students live in single-sex, home-style residences. Each residence houses from 5 to 16 students and is led by members of the Student Leadership Team, upper-year students who facilitate the smooth functioning of the residences. Residences are named after a specific saint or Marian title. Students form community through prayer, house nights once per month, and chores, among other activities.

Students have the opportunity to take part in hikes, sports, musical performances, field trips, community prayer, choir practices, dances, special guest lectures, campus clubs and more. Official clubs include the Don Bosco Drama Club, the Paul Sanders and Janine Lieu Pro-Life Club, the John-David Filmmaking Club, the Tolkien Club, and Ecclesiastical Schola.

SWC's chaplain offers private spiritual direction and confession to students.

Buildings and Sites

Campus Buildings
 St. Mary Hall
 St. Joseph Hall
 St. Anthony Hall 
 St. John Henry Newman Classroom Building
 Saint Bede the Venerable Classroom Building
 Blessed Dina Bélanger Music Building

Accreditation 
Our Lady Seat of Wisdom College is authorized by the Province of Ontario to offer a Bachelor of Catholic Studies degree.

Presidents 

 Dr. David Warner, 2008 – 2009
 Dr. Keith Cassidy, 2009 – 2019
 Dr. Ryan Williams, 2019 – 2020
 Dr. Christine Schintgen, Interim President, 2020 – 2022, President 2022- present

References

Private colleges in Ontario
Educational institutions established in 2000
2000 establishments in Ontario
Liberal arts colleges
Catholic universities and colleges in Canada
Seminaries and theological colleges in Canada
Traditionalist Catholicism